Los Morros del Norte are a Mexican Norteño band. The band was founded by brothers Fermin, Javier, and Tomas Beltran, and their cousin Samuel Ayon, all originally from Tamazula Durango. They made their professional recording debut in 1993.

Discography
La Cadena
20 Años

References

Mexican musical groups